"New Dawn Fades" is a song by English rock band Joy Division from their 1979 debut album Unknown Pleasures. The song opens with a backwards and heavily modified sample from a previous song, "Insight", presumably added by Martin Hannett, post-production. 

The song relies on an ascending guitar riff by Bernard Sumner played against a descending bass riff by Peter Hook. The song uses the same progression throughout, but grows in intensity as the song progresses, reaching its peak with Ian Curtis singing "Me, seeing me this time, hoping for something else", and ending with a guitar solo. The song closes side one of Unknown Pleasures. It's also one of few Joy Division songs with two distinct guitars playing, one distorted and one a clean electric guitar picking notes from the guitar chords.

Cover versions
It has been covered by Moby, and he later featured on New Order's cover for the 24 Hour Party People soundtrack. There is also a version from Red Hot Chili Peppers guitarist John Frusciante. Ambient techno act The Sight Below covered it on its second album It All Falls Apart, featuring vocals by Jesy Fortino of Tiny Vipers. Rheinallt H Rowlands recorded a Welsh language version of the song, Gwawr Newydd Yn Cilio.

In popular culture
"New Dawn Fades" has been featured in several films.  In the 1995 film Heat, an instrumental version of Moby's cover plays during the car chase leading up to Al Pacino's and Robert De Niro's first on-screen meeting.  Joy Division's original was used in the 2005 remake of House of Wax, and a live version was featured in the 2006 Academy Award nominee Reprise.  An instrumental version was produced by Christopher Drake on the Batman Year One Soundtrack. It was most recently used in the soundtrack for Antoine Fuqua's 2014 movie The Equalizer, starring Denzel Washington. It is in the soundtrack of ACAB - All Cops Are Bastards.

References

1979 songs
Joy Division songs
Song recordings produced by Martin Hannett
Songs about suicide
Songs written by Bernard Sumner
Songs written by Ian Curtis
Songs written by Peter Hook
Songs written by Stephen Morris (musician)